The Best of the Joe Perry Project is a compilation album by The Joe Perry Project.

Track listing
"Let the Music Do the Talking" (from Let the Music Do the Talking)
"Conflict of Interest" (from Let the Music Do the Talking)
"Discount Dogs" (from Let the Music Do the Talking)
"Shooting Star" (from Let the Music Do the Talking)
"Break Song" (from Let the Music Do the Talking)
"Rockin' Train" (from Let the Music Do the Talking)
"Life at a Glance" (from Let the Music Do the Talking)
"Bone to Bone" (Non-album b-side)
"East Coast, West Coast" (from I've Got the Rock'n'Rolls Again)
"I've Got the Rock'n'Rolls Again" (from I've Got the Rock'n'Rolls Again)
"No Substitute for Arrogance" (from I've Got the Rock'n'Rolls Again)
"Buzz Buzz" (from I've Got the Rock'n'Rolls Again)
"Soldier of Fortune" (from I've Got the Rock'n'Rolls Again)
"South Station Blues" (from I've Got the Rock'n'Rolls Again)
"Once a Rocker, Always a Rocker" (from Once a Rocker, Always a Rocker)
"Black Velvet Pants" (from Once a Rocker, Always a Rocker)
"King of the Kings" (from Once a Rocker, Always a Rocker)
"Bang a Gong" (from Once a Rocker, Always a Rocker)
"Walk With Me Sally" (from Once a Rocker, Always a Rocker)
"Never Wanna Stop" (from Once a Rocker, Always a Rocker)

1999 compilation albums
The Joe Perry Project albums